Otto Heurnius (born Otto van Heurn; 8 September 1577 – 14 July 1652) was a Dutch physician, theologian and philosopher.

Life
He studied at Leiden University. He subsequently succeeded his father Johannes Heurnius as professor of medicine at Leiden University, and took over anatomy teaching from Pieter Pauw from 1617. Alongside his practical anatomy teaching, he had the care of a very various collection of zoological and botanical specimens. The aims of the collection included reconstruction of the life of the Israelites in Egypt, as in the Book of Exodus.
 
He was also a historian of philosophy, stressing the period before the philosophers of the Ancient Greeks ("barbarian philosophy").  He based his ideas on the Corpus Hermeticum.

References

External links

WorldCat page
martherus.com

1577 births
1652 deaths
17th-century Dutch physicians
Dutch anatomists
17th-century Dutch anatomists
17th-century Dutch philosophers
Leiden University alumni
Academic staff of Leiden University
People from Leiden